Tom Varner Quartet is the debut album by American jazz French horn player and composer Tom Varner recorded in 1980 and released on the Italian Soul Note label.

Reception

The AllMusic review by Ron Wynn awarded the album 4½ stars and stated, "Tom Varner turned heads and opened eyes on the jazz scene in the early '80s. There weren't, and still aren't, many French horn players who improvise and play with the facility he demonstrated on this 1980 session".

The authors of the Penguin Guide to Jazz Recordings wrote that the album "depend[s] on satisfying solos to make a modest impact."

A reviewer for Billboard noted that the album "establishes Varner near the very top of the admittedly brief list of players committed to venturing into jazz with this symphonic instrument," and commented: "What distinguishes Varner is both his compositional focus... and astonishing technique. Rapid flurries of notes and raucous slurs may be routine on other brass horns, but on this instrument those effects represent obvious care."

Track listing
All compositions written and arranged by Tom Varner
 "The Otter" - 7:43 
 "Radiator" - 8:26 
 "12 12" - 7:39 
 "TV TV" - 10:05 
 "Heaps" - 10:28
Recorded at Sorcerer Sound in New York City on August 29, 1980

Cover photo by Vittorio Sacco, back photos by Lee Snider and Carlo Verri

Personnel
Tom Varner - French horn
Ed Jackson - alto saxophone
Fred Hopkins - bass
Billy Hart - drums

References

Black Saint/Soul Note albums
Tom Varner albums
1980 albums